Abraham James Byandala is a Ugandan engineer and politician. He is the former Minister for Works and Transportation in the Ugandan Cabinet. He was appointed to that position on 27 May 2011. He replaced John Nasasira, who was appointed Government Chief Whip. Byandala also serves as the elected Member of Parliament for Katikamu County North, in Luweero District.

Background
He was born in Luweero District on 14 January 1950.

Education
Abraham Byandala holds the degree of Bachelor of Science in Civil Engineering (BSc.Civ.Eng.), obtained from Makerere University, the oldest and largest public university in Uganda. His degree of Master of Science in Civil Engineering (MSc.Civ.Eng.), was obtained from the University of Strathclyde, in Glasgow, Scotland.

Work history
His work history spans over 40 years in Uganda's road transport. Prior to his appointment as Minister of Transport and Works, he  served as the Kampala City Engineer and Surveyor. At one time he served as the chairman of the government's Committee on Physical Infrastructure. He is the elected Member of Parliament, representing Katikamu County North, Luweero District.

See also
 Cabinet of Uganda
 Parliament of Uganda
 Kampala Capital City Authority

References

External links
  Full of List of Ugandan Cabinet Ministers May 2011

1950 births
Living people
Government ministers of Uganda
Members of the Parliament of Uganda
Ugandan civil engineers
Ganda people
People from Luweero District
Makerere University alumni
National Resistance Movement politicians
Alumni of the University of Strathclyde
21st-century Ugandan politicians